Eupithecia interrubrescens is a moth in the  family Geometridae. It is found in Tibet.

References

Moths described in 1902
interrubrescens
Moths of Asia